Barthélémy "Rémy" Raffalli (16 March 1913 – 10 September 1952) was a French Army major who fought in World War II and the First Indochina War.

Early life and pre-war service

He entered the Saint-Cyr Military School on 1 October 1933 as part of the King Albert I promotion and graduated in 1935. Raffalli then chose to enter the cavalry of the French Army and studied at the Armoured Cavalry Branch Training School in Saumur. In 1936 he was posted to the 1st Regiment of Spahis in Algeria, which he joined at Médéa, and then the 3rd Moroccan Regiment of Spahis.

World War II service
Raffalli joined the French Expeditionary Corps in Italy in 1943 and served with distinction. On 17 March 1944, he was seriously wounded while leading a squadron of the 5th Moroccan Spahis Regiment.

Post War service and death
Raffalli earned his parachute badge in September 1949. After a short tour with the 3rd Foreign Parachute Battalion 3ème BEP and 1st Foreign Parachute Battalion 1et BEP, he took command of the 2nd Foreign Parachute Battalion 2èmeBEP on 12 September 1950 in Hanoi, Vietnam. He was promoted to Chef d'Escadrons on 1 July 1951 and led the battalion during the Battle of Nghia Lo in October 1951. He was fatally wounded on 1 September 1952 while leading his battalion; he died on 10 September 1952 in Saigon.

Honors and awards

Ribons

Decorations
Légion d'honneur
Knight (1944)
Officer (1951)
Commander (1951)
Croix de guerre 1939-1945 with one bronze star
Croix de guerre des Théatres d'Opérations Exterieures with one bronze star

Legacy

Posthumous homages

Camp Raffalli 

Camp Raffalli, the headquarters of the 2nd Foreign Parachute Regiment (2ème REP) is named in his memory.

Promotion class « Chef d'Escadrons Raffalli » École militaire interarmes ESM 

The 183rd promotion of the École spéciale militaire de Saint-Cyr chose the promotion Chef d'Escadrons Raffalli. The song of the promotion recalls the arms celebration of Chef d'Escadrons Raffalli .

Rémy Raffalli - Gallery

See also 

Major (France)
French Foreign Legion Music Band (MLE)

References

1913 births
1951 deaths
People from Nice
French Army officers
French military personnel of World War II
French military personnel of the First Indochina War
French military personnel killed in the First Indochina War
Officers of the French Foreign Legion
École Spéciale Militaire de Saint-Cyr alumni
Commandeurs of the Légion d'honneur
Recipients of the Croix de Guerre 1939–1945 (France)
Recipients of the Croix de guerre des théâtres d'opérations extérieures